Chisago Lakes High School, located in Lindström, Minnesota, serves more than 1,100 students in grades 9-12. The school has earned accreditation by the North Central Association of Colleges and Schools. It provides an average curriculum for its students, containing a good variety of electives and all of the state required courses. Chisago Lakes High School offers a fine arts program as well as 24 athletic activities and 20 co-curricular activities.

Accountability Programs
The Minnesota Department of Education announced that Chisago Lakes High School failed to make Adequate Yearly Progress (AYP) under the federal No Child Left Behind Act for the 2007–08 and 2009-10 school years. The department of education is expected to release results for the 2010-11 school year sometime before September 30, 2011.

Chisago Lakes High School was one of four schools in the Chisago Lakes School District and one of the 937 Minnesota schools that did not see improvement for the 2007-08 school year, but did see an improvement in the 2012-2013, 2013-2014 school years and was awarded bronze in the national school rankings

Sports 
Chisago Lakes High School has recently become a member of the Mississippi 8 conference which includes the Chisago Lakes Wildcats, Monticello Magic, North Branch Vikings, Buffalo Bison, Princeton Tigers, The Cambridge-Isanti Bluejackets, Rogers Royals, Big Lake Hornets, St. Michael - Albertville Knights, and the St. Francis Saints.

Fall
Cross Country
Football
Soccer-Boys
Soccer-Girls
Swim and Dive-Girls
Tennis-Girls
Volleyball
Chearleading
Winter
Basketball-Boys
Basketball-Girls
Dance
Gymnastics
Hockey-Boys
Hockey-Girls
Alpine Skiing
Swim and Dive-Boys
Wrestling
Power Lifting
Spring
Baseball
Golf-Girls
Golf-Boys
Softball
Tennis-Boys
Track and Field
Lacrosse-Boys
Lacrosse-Girls

Arts 
Chisago Lakes High School offers a few co-curricular and extra-curricular programs in the arts. Their musical theatre program, has put on 11 productions, notably 2014's White Christmas which won Outstanding Overall Production/Performance from the Hennepin Theatre Trust's SpotLight program. 
 Band
 Choir
 Fall Musical
 One Act Play
 Speech
 Knowledge Bowl
 Math League
 Supermileage

Clubs 
 BPA
 DECA
 FFA
 NHS
 SADD
 Student Council
 VICA
 Yearbook
 Link Crew
 Go WILD

References

External links

Public high schools in Minnesota
Educational institutions established in 1943
Schools in Chisago County, Minnesota
1943 establishments in Minnesota